There are a number of sports clubs in Finland which are playing bandy. The top-tier Finnish bandy league, Bandyliiga, contains 9 teams. The second-tier league, Suomisarja, contains 7 teams.

Bandyliiga

Porvoon Akilles, Porvoo
Botnia-69, Helsinki
HIFK Bandy, Helsinki
JPS, Jyväskylä
Mikkelin Kampparit, Mikkeli
Narukerä, Pori
Oulun Luistinseura, Oulu
Veiterä, Lappeenranta
WP 35, Varkaus

Updated for 2014-15 season.

Suomisarja

HIFK/2, Helsinki
Uleåborg IFK, Oulu
Veiterä/2, Lappeenranta
Lennex BK, Oulu
Vesta, Helsinki
Kampparit/2, Mikkeli
JPS/2, Jyväskylä

Updated for 2014-15 season.

Others
Sudet
Oulun Palloseura
Tornio PV
Vastus

External links
Finnish Bandy Federation
Bandyliiga
Suomisarja

Bandy-related lists by country